Andy Straden (also spelled Stradan) (November 27, 1897 – June 1967) was a United States soccer forward who was a member of the 1924 U.S. Olympic Team and played professionally in the first American Soccer League.

American Soccer League
Straden, was an amateur player in the early 1920s with Fleisher Yarn when the team won the 1924 National Amateur Cup. That summer, he was selected to play with the United States at the Summer Olympics.  When he returned to the United States, Straden rejoined Fleisher Yarn for the 1924-1925 American Soccer League season.  This was Yarn’s first season as a professional club and its first season in the ASL.  Straden scored twenty goals in thirty-four games that season before moving to the Shawsheen Indians for the start of the 1925-1926 season.  However, the Indians folded two months into the season and he ended the season with the New York Giants.  He played only two games with the Giants during the 1926-1927 season and retired.

National and Olympic teams
At the 1924 Summer Olympics, the U.S. fielded an entirely amateur side, including Straden.  In the four games that year, two at the games and two during a European exhibition tour following the United States’s elimination.  In the first United States game of the Olympics, the United States defeated Estonia off a tenth minute Straden penalty kick.  Uruguay, the dominant national team of the era, easily eliminated the United States in the next round.  Following their elimination, the United States defeated Poland in Warsaw, 3-2.  Two of the United States goals came from Straden.  Then the United States fell to Ireland in Dublin.  Aside from those four games that year, Straden never again suited up for the United States

See also
List of United States men's international soccer players born outside the United States

References

1897 births
1967 deaths
People from Bothwell
Scottish emigrants to the United States
United States men's international soccer players
American Soccer League (1921–1933) players
Fleisher Yarn players
New York Giants (soccer) players
Shawsheen Indians players
Olympic soccer players of the United States
Footballers at the 1924 Summer Olympics
Footballers from South Lanarkshire
American soccer players
Association football forwards